Lorenzo Galossi (born 25 May 2006) is an Italian competitive swimmer. He is the world junior record in the long course 800-metre freestyle and the European junior record holder in the long course 400-metre freestyle. At the 2022 European Aquatics Championships, he won the bronze medal in the 800-metre freestyle. At the 2022 European Junior Championships, he won medals in three individual events, the gold medal each in the 400-metre freestyle and the 800-metre freestyle and the silver medal in the 200-metre freestyle.

Background
Galossi was born 25 May 2006 in the Mentana area of Rome, Italy and competes for Circolo Canottieri Aniene, CC Aniene, in national and regional competitions. The end of 2022 to beginning of 2023, he transitioned coaching and training methodologies, one change of which included swimming in the evening instead of the early afternoon.

Career

2021–2022
At the 2021 European Junior Swimming Championships, held in Rome in July, Galossi won a bronze medal as part of the 4×200-metre freestyle relay, splitting a 1:50.32 for the first leg of the relay, placed fifth in the 800-metre freestyle, 11th in the 400-metre freestyle, and 12th in the 200-metre freestyle. The following year, as a 15-year-old at the 2022 Italian National Spring Championships in Riccione, he won the silver medal in the 400-metre freestyle with a European junior record time of 3:45.93, qualified for the 2022 World Aquatics Championships in the event, and placed fourth in the 800-metre freestyle with a personal best time of 7:49.76.

2022 World Aquatics Championships
For swimming competition at the 2022 World Aquatics Championships, held in June at Danube Arena in Budapest, Hungary, Galossi entered to compete in the 400-metre freestyle. He placed twelfth in the preliminaries of the event, not qualifying for the final with his time of 3:47.19, which was 0.72 seconds behind fellow Italian Marco De Tullio who advanced to the final ranking eighth.

2022 European Junior Championships

Less than three weeks later, on 5 July, Galossi won a bronze medal in the 4×100-metre freestyle relay on the first day of the 2022 European Junior Swimming Championships, held in Otopeni, Romania, splitting a 50.08 for the lead-off leg of the relay in the final to help achieve a time of 3:19.42. The following day, he won a silver medal in the 200-metre freestyle with a personal best time of 1:47.71 seconds to narrowly finish less than two-tenths of a second ahead of bronze medalist Jacob Whittle of Great Britain. Three days later, he started the finals session winning a gold medal in the 800-metre freestyle with a time of 7:52.04. A little under 30 minutes after this first gold medal of the session, he followed his performance up with a second gold medal, this time helping achieve the first-place finish in the 4×200-metre freestyle relay in a time of 7:17.45 swimming the fourth-leg of the relay. On 10 July, the final day of competition, he won the gold medal in the 400-metre freestyle with a time of 3:48.14, finishing over two seconds ahead of the two swimmers who tied for the silver medal Vlad Stancu of Romania and Krzysztof Chmielewski of Poland.

Ten days later, at the 2022 Italian National Summer Championships in Ostia during the 2022 European heat waves with temperatures around 40 °C (104 °F), Galossi lowered his personal best time in the 800-metre freestyle to a 7:46.28, which marked a drop of over three seconds. On 21 July, as part of the same Championships, he lowered his personal best time in the 200-metre freestyle to a 1:47.42.

2022 European Aquatics Championships

Galossi was the youngest swimmer named to the Italy team roster for the 2022 European Aquatics Championships, held in August in Rome, at 16 years of age. On day one, he swam a 1:47.00 for the anchor leg of the 4×200-metre freestyle relay in the preliminaries, contributing to a time of 7:09.03 and first-rank final qualification. In the final, he split a 1:47.91 for the second leg of the relay to help win the silver medal in a time of 7:06.25. The following day, he ranked fourth in the preliminaries of the 800-metre freestyle with a time of 7:49.08, qualifying for the final less than two-tenths of a second behind third-ranked fellow Italian Gregorio Paltrinieri. His new world junior record, broke the former mark set by Mack Horton of Australia at 7:45.67 in 2013 by over two full seconds. Day seven of seven, he ranked fifth in the preliminaries of the 400 metre freestyle with a 3:48.15, just 0.17 seconds ahead of fellow Italian Gabriele Detti, who ranked sixth, and as Galossi and Detti were the two fastest Italians they both qualified for the evening final. With a time of 3:46.94 in the final, he placed fifth, finishing 2.41 seconds behind bronze medalist Henning Mühlleitner of Germany.

2023
For the January to April 2023 time frame, Galossi focused on recovery from illness (mononucleosis) and transitioning coaches and training methodologies with uncertainty expressed as to whether he would be well enough to compete at the 2023 Assoluti Championships and 2023 World Aquatics Championships.

International championships (50 m)

Personal best times

Long course metres (50 m pool)

Legend: WJ – World junior record; EJ – European junior record; r – relay 1st leg

Records

European junior records

Long course metres (50 m pool)

Legend: WJ – World junior record

References

External links
 

2006 births
Living people
Italian male swimmers
Italian male freestyle swimmers
Swimmers from Rome
European Aquatics Championships medalists in swimming
21st-century Italian people